The  Mouvement de libération des femmes (MLF) is a French autonomous, single-sex feminist movement that advocates women's bodily autonomy and challenges patriarchal society.  It was founded in 1970, in the wake of the American Women's Lib movement and the events of May 1968. The movement challenges traditional forms of militancy: it operates through general assemblies, small decentralized groups and has a repertoire of extra-parliamentary actions such as the organization of events, the creation and signing of petitions, the holding of public meetings, etc.

History 
On August 26, 1970, a dozen anonymous activists laid a wreath under the Arc de Triomphe in praise of the Wife of the Unknown Soldier. This action was led by nine women, including Cathy Bernheim, Christine Delphy, Monique Wittig, Christiane Rochefort and Namascar Shaktini. Their banners displayed this phrase: "There is more unknown than the unknown soldier: his wife".

They were immediately arrested by the police, but the next day the press announced "the birth of the MLF".

At its origins, the MLF was neither a movement nor a political party: no leader was tolerated. The movement is composed by collectives and small groups. The feminist militants want to fight in all fronts, based on the principle that "the private is political". They reject the ideals of beauty imposed by the patriarchal diktat, claim for nurseries, ask their partners to share domestic tasks. The sexual revolution has gone through it: they denounce rape, incest and sexual assault, and fight for abortion.

One of the first actions of the movement was to support the rebellion in the center for pregnant teenagers from Plessis-Robinson, who were between 13 and 17 years old. At the end of 1971, the residents began, with the help of the MLF, on a hunger strike to refuse the fate that was imposed on them: excluded from their school, marginalized by their own family, mistreated. Alerted by the MLF, Simone de Beauvoir went to meet them, accompanied by journalists.

Economic and political progress 
The women of the women's liberation movement profoundly transformed society and values during the second half of the twentieth century. They encouraged a considerable change in the conception of women's rights, in particular the reforms on the birth control, professional and parental equality, and the law on parity.

References 

1970 establishments in France
Feminist organizations in France